Nicrophorus chryseus may be a species of burying beetle described by Mazokhin-Porshnyakov in 1953.  It is not yet verified that this species is unique from other species of Nicrophorus.

References

Silphidae
Beetles of North America
Beetles described in 1953